Krikke is a Dutch surname. Notable people with the surname include:

 Harold Krikke (born 1967), Dutch scientist
  (born 1940), Dutch painter and sculptor
 Pauline Krikke (born 1961), Dutch politician

Dutch-language surnames